The Antalya Subregion (Turkish: Antalya Alt Bölgesi) (TR61) is a statistical subregion in Turkey.

Provinces 

 Antalya Province (TR611)
 Isparta Province (TR612)
 Burdur Province (TR613)

See also 

 NUTS of Turkey

External links 
 TURKSTAT

Sources 
 ESPON Database

Statistical subregions of Turkey